The Student Federation of Ivory Coast  (French: Fédération estudiantine et scolaire de Côte d'Ivoire, FESCI) is a youth and student organization in Ivory Coast that aims to protect rights of Ivorian students at school and university.

Founded in the early 1990s as a student union, some members of the association have gone on to be involved in politics. For instance, Guillaume Soro (Secretary general of the FESCI 1995-1998), who has been prime minister of Ivory Coast (2007-2012), is the current President of the National Assembly of Ivory Coast.

References

Politics of Ivory Coast
Political organizations based in Ivory Coast
Education in Ivory Coast
Educational organizations based in Ivory Coast
Youth organizations based in Ivory Coast
Nationalism in Africa
1990s establishments in Africa
Student organizations in Africa